Emtan Karmiel. Ltd. is an Israeli company that develops and manufactures small arms, pistols and rifles, for militaries and law enforcement agencies in Israel and around the world.

History

Founded in 1977 by Reuven Zada. Emtan Karmiel Company started its operation as a family business, producing precision machining parts for the defense industry. In the early 1980s, the company began manufacturing rifle parts and precision parts for the Israel defense industry 

Since the late 1990s, Emtan Karmiel is an Original Equipment Manufacturer (OEM) that specializes in parts for Israeli made weapons and the A15 model (M4 / M16 sub-models), while operating production lines for rifle kits, as well as rifles and guns parts for European manufacturers.

Emtan Karmiel manufactures in-house rifles, pistols, modern barrels, and SMG (Submachine guns).

International operations

Emtan Karmiel provides products for customers such as the Philippine National Police (PNP), the Philippine Bureau of Jail Management and Penology (BJMP), the Royal Thai Police (RTP), manufacturers of firearms in Switzerland, Germany, England, and others customers in America, customers located in Africa and South America and for the commercial market in Europe, South and Central America.

Products

Military and Law Enforcement 

 MZ-4 Automatic rifle that comply with the MIL-SPEC (M4/M16 equivalent).
 MZ-4 P Automatic rifle MZ-4 with Piston operation system (M4/M16 with improved operation and design).
 MZ-4 P FRB MZ-4 with Piston operation system and Folding Retractable Buttstock.
 MZ-47 Automatic rifle for use with AK47 Magazines and ammo 7.62x39  (M4/M16 platform with AK47 compatibility).
 MZ-300 Automatic rifle 300 Blackout 7.62x35 (M4/M16 platform with 300 Blackout barrel for special forces)
 MZ-9 Automatic Sub-machinegun (SMG) (M4/M16 compact platform with 9MM NATO capabilities).
 Spare parts and conversion from old "long" M16 to new "short" flat-top M4 (ideal for government that want to modify existing rifle stock instead of going for a new purchase and tender)
 Ramon 9mm striker polymer Pistol 
 MZ-10S Sniper Rifle

Commercial and civilian

 MZ-15 Semi-automatic rifle MIL-SPEC  (AR15 equivalent).
 MZ-15 P Semi-automatic rifle MZ-15  with Piston operation system (AR15 with improved operation and design)
 MZ-15 P FRB MZ-15 with Piston operation system and Folding Retractable Buttstock.
 MZ-47 S Semi-Automatic rifle for use with AK47 Magazines and ammo 7.62x39 (AR15 platform with AK47 compatibility).
 MZ-300 S Semi-automatic rifle 300 Blackout 7.62x35 (AR15 platform with 300 Blackout barrel)
 MZ-9 S Semi-automatic sub-machinegun/pistol (AR15 compact platform with 9MM NATO capabilities).
 Ramon 9mm striker polymer Pistol 
 MZ-10S Sniper Rifle

References

External links 
 Company's Website
 החלטות ממשלה
 Company Introduction
 Emtan Karmiel
 EMTAN KARMIEL LTD
 אמתן כרמיאל IWI מתמודדות על מכרזי נשק למשטרה הפיליפינית

Manufacturing companies established in 1977
Weapons manufacturing companies
Defense companies of Israel
Israeli companies established in 1977